Milton is a series of animated shorts created by Mike Judge in 1991.

Background
They aired on Saturday Night Live in the mid-1990s and, like Judge's other early shorts, appeared on MTV's Liquid Television in the early 1990s. In the cartoon shorts, all voices are provided by Judge. The 1999 film Office Space was based upon the cartoons, and featured actor Stephen Root in the role of Milton Waddams. Although Milton was the title character from the shorts, the role was a supporting character in the Office Space feature film, as was his boss, Bill Lumbergh (played by actor Gary Cole in Office Space). Milton traveled to different locations despite being consistently late for his taxis to take him there.

See also 
Dilbert, a comic strip by Scott Adams with a similar premise

References
The First Animations of Mike Judge

Film series introduced in 1991
Animated short film series
1991 animated films
1991 films
Saturday Night Live sketches
Saturday Night Live in the 1990s
Workplace comedies
Films directed by Mike Judge
American animated short films
1990s American films